Castleton Corners (or Four Corners) is an upscale neighborhood of Staten Island, one of the five boroughs of New York City. It is in a region of the island often referred to as the North Shore, Staten Island.

Description
The word "corners" in the neighborhood's name refers to the intersection of Victory Boulevard and Manor Road, which forms its core. This part of Castleton, Staten Island was once called Centerville, but became more popularly known as Castleton Corners when a post office by that name was opened there in 1872. "Castleton" refers to Cassiltowne, County Kildare, Ireland, the birthplace of Thomas Dongan, the colonial governor of the Province of New York after it was obtained from the Dutch—who had called it New Amsterdam—in 1682. The post office later closed, but reopened in 1949, and today it is the general, or main, post office for Staten Island as a whole, its ZIP Code being 10314.

Castleton Corners is separated from its eastern neighbor Sunnyside by Castleton Hill, noted for the two churches that stand across from one another on its western ridge—a Moravian church (Castleton Hill Moravian Church) on one side of Victory Boulevard and a Roman Catholic church (St. Teresa's) on the other. To the north lies West Brighton, with the Staten Island Armory of the New York Army National Guard at the boundary between the two. Westerleigh and Meiers Corners lie to the northwest and southwest, respectively, and Todt Hill rises to the south. The Todt Hill public housing project is actually in Castleton Corners in spite of its name.

The corner of Victory Boulevard and Manor Road has long been the center of an important commercial district, although its prominence has declined somewhat in recent decades due to the opening of the Staten Island Mall in 1973. The area had largely been built up by the time the Verrazano-Narrows Bridge opened in 1964. Castleton Corners was relatively unaffected by the dramatic upsurge in population after the bridge's opening, compared with most other neighborhoods on the island.

Education
Schools are P.S. 29 and St. Teresa's School.

Transportation
Castleton Corners is served by the  local bus routes, and the  express bus routes. The former S67 route through Castleton Corners was discontinued in 2010 due to low ridership, and many bus routes through the area were truncated to run a shorter route or only during weekdays.

References

1872 establishments in New York (state)
 
Neighborhoods in Staten Island
Populated places established in 1872